Tokelau, Tuvalu is a village on the island of Nanumanga, Tuvalu.

Population
Tokelau's population is 281. It is the smaller of Nanumanga's two villages.

Linguistic background
Tokelau means "north-northeast" in Tuvaluan and some other Polynesian languages

Climate
Tokelau has a tropical rainforest climate (Af) with heavy rainfall year-round.

See also

References

Populated places in Tuvalu
Nanumanga